John A. Lanning House is a historic home located near Fairview, Buncombe County, North Carolina. It was built in 1839, and is a -story, rectangular saddlebag form dwelling.  It consists of two sections connected by a central fieldstone chimney. It features full length shed porches.  Also on the property are the contributing log double corn crib, a double pen log barn and a barrel house where the owner operated a government licensed still.

It was listed on the National Register of Historic Places in 1982.

References

Houses on the National Register of Historic Places in North Carolina
Houses completed in 1839
Houses in Buncombe County, North Carolina
National Register of Historic Places in Buncombe County, North Carolina